The Ministry of National Assets of Chile (MBN) The Ministry of National Assets of Chile (MBN) is an institution in charge of recognizing and managing the fiscal patrimony or property. Likewise, other of its functions is regularating the small real estate and to control over the national assets of public use.

Its current minister is Javiera Alejandra Toro Cáceres.

History
In 1871, under Federico Errázuriz Zañartu's government (1871−1876), it was created the Ministry of Foreign Relations and Colonization to order the occupation of the southern lands. When the inhabitants settled in the south of Chile, the State assumed a new role aimed at the administration of fiscal assets, the conservation of heritage and the exploitation of natural benefits.

In 1888, preserving the same attributions, this ministry took the name of «Foreign Relations, Worship and Colonization». As a result of the numerous problems between settlers and indigenous people due to the diffuse legality over the dominion of the existing property, the Austral Property Ministry was created in 1930. Its mission was being in charge of the colonizing occupation policies south of the Malleco River. At the same time, that year also was established the Department of National Assets and Colonization, under the freshly formed Ministry of Austral Property. Its mission was to manage the public lands to deliver them —with absolute legal knowledge— to the settlers of southern Chile.

In 1977, with the DL N°1939 of Augusto Pinochet's regime, it was created the Ministry of Lands and Colonization, which shortly after, on 5 June 1980, adopted the current name of «Ministry of National Assets». Similarly, its functions were redefined, being adapted to the new social, economic and political reality of Chile.

References

External links
 

Government ministries of Chile